The 2007 Asian Women's Club Volleyball Championship was the 8th staging of the AVC Club Championships. The tournament was held in Vĩnh Yên, Vĩnh Phúc Province, Vietnam.

Results

|}

|}

Final standing

Awards
MVP:  Yelena Pavlova (Rahat)
Best Scorer:  Nguyễn Thị Ngọc Hoa (Sport Center 1)
Best Server:  Pleumjit Thinkaow (Sang Som)
Best Spiker:  Yelena Pavlova (Rahat)
Best Blocker:  Nguyễn Thị Ngọc Hoa (Sport Center 1)
Best Receiver:  Yuko Sano (Hisamitsu)
Best Setter:  Nootsara Tomkom (Sang Som)
Best Digger:  Wanna Buakaew (Sang Som)
Miss Volleyball:  Anastasia Bezzubtseva (SKIF)

References
Asian Volleyball Confederation

A
International volleyball competitions hosted by Vietnam
Asian Women